Swami Vivekananda (1863-1902) was a chief disciple of Ramakrishna.

Swami Vivekananda or Vivekanda may also refer to:
Swami Vivekananda (1955 film)
Swami Vivekananda (1998 film)
Swami Vivekananda Airport
Swami Vivekananda Bridge or Ellis Bridge
Swami Vivekananda Institute of Technology
Swami Vivekanand Road (Mumbai)
Swami Vivekananda Road metro station, Bangalore
Vivekananda Setu, a bridge over the Hooghly River in West Bengal, India